The men's 1500 metre freestyle competition of the swimming events at the 2012 European Aquatics Championships took place May 22 and 23. The heats took place on May 22, the final on May 23.

Records
Prior to the competition, the existing world, European and championship records were as follows.

Results

Heats
23 swimmers participated in 3 heats.

Final
The final was held at 17:02.

References

Men's 1500 m freestyle